Yantian Port West station is a station on Line 8 of the Shenzhen Metro. It opened on 28 October 2020.

Station layout

Exits

References

Shenzhen Metro stations
Railway stations in Guangdong
Railway stations in China opened in 2020